(The Csárdás Princess; translated into English as The Riviera Girl and The Gipsy Princess) is an operetta in 3 acts by Hungarian composer Emmerich Kálmán, with libretto by Leo Stein and Bela Jenbach. Numerous film versions and recordings have been made. The operetta is widely beloved across Europe, particularly in Hungary, Austria, Germany, and the former Soviet Union, where it was adapted into a popular film. It is arguably Kálmán's most successful work.

Roles

Synopsis
Place: Budapest and Vienna
Time: shortly before the outbreak of the First World War

Act 1

Sylva Varescu, a self-sufficient and professionally successful cabaret performer from Budapest, is about to embark on a tour of America. Three of her aristocratic admirers, named Edwin, Feri, and Boni, prefer her to stay. Edwin, unaware that his parents have already arranged a marriage for him back home in Vienna, orders a notary to prepare a promissory note of his expected marriage to Sylva within ten weeks. Sylva then leaves on her American tour, and Edwin leaves for peacetime military duty.

Act 2
Just at the time this promissory note is about to expire, Sylva visits Edwin's palace in Vienna, pretending to have married Boni as her entrée into his family's society. Edwin is about to be engaged to Stasi, who does not care for him and wishes only an arranged marriage. Boni falls in love with Stasi and Edwin regrets not keeping his promise to Sylva sooner. However, Edwin makes the faux pas of informing Sylva that his parents would accept Sylva only if she pretends to have been divorced from Boni and therefore already entered society via an earlier marriage. Edwin's father separately informs Sylva that if she marries Edwin without first having achieved noble rank through some other route, her role in society could be merely that of a "csárdás princess." Sylva realizes that she is better than they and has a brighter future than they have. She purposefully embarrasses Edwin and his father, turning her back on them and leaving in the presence of their assembled friends.

Act 3
The act is set in a Viennese hotel to which Feri has accompanied the cabaret troupe from Budapest, who is about to sail on another American tour with Sylva. As everyone shows up and recognizes each other, Feri recognizes Edwin's mother as a retired cabaret singer from Budapest whose star once shone prior to Sylva's time. Edwin's mother joins the two couples, Sylva/Edwin and Boni/Stasi, all unwittingly heading to safety on this American tour.

Recordings 
Key: Conductor / Stasi / Sylva / Boni / Edwin / Feri
		
 Samuil Samosud / Kazanskaya / Yakovenko / Ruban / Nelepp / Yakushev – 1956 – Melodiya
 Grund / Koller / Moffo / Németh / Kollo / Mensáros – 1971 – Szinetár movie – Deutsche Grammphon DVD
 Gunhard Mattes / Olivera Miljaković / Anneliese Rothenberger / Willi Brokmeier / Nicolai Gedda / Wolfgang Anheisser – 1971 – EMI
 Bibl / Kales / Rudiferia / Poppell / Franz Wächter / Németh – 1985 – live in Tokyo – Denon
 Bonynge / Hislop / Riedel / Lemke / Austin / Ewer – 1990 – Sydney – Opus Arte DVD
 Bibl / Grotrian / Schoenenberg / Werba / Bothmer / Harsányi – 2002 – Mörbisch – Videoland DVD
 Bibl / Grotrian / Serafin / Eröd / Bothmer / Harsányi – 2002 – Oehms
 Bonynge / Mojca Erdmann / Yvonne Kenny / Kathol / Roider / Ebner – 2002 – Naxos Records

Film adaptations
It was made into a 1927 silent German film The Csardas Princess directed by Hanns Schwarz. In 1944 it was made into the Soviet operetta film Sylva directed by Aleksandr Ivanovsky. It was one of the most successful releases in the Soviet Union that year.
, directed by Emil Leyde (Germany, 1919)
The Csardas Princess, directed by Hanns Schwarz (Germany/Hungary, 1927)
The Csardas Princess, directed by Georg Jacoby (German, 1934)
Sylva, directed by Aleksandr Ivanovsky (Soviet Union, 1944)
The Csardas Princess, directed by Georg Jacoby (West Germany, 1951)
, directed by Miklós Szinetár (West Germany/Hungary, 1971, TV film)
, directed by Yan Frid (Soviet Union, 1981)

References

External links 

Recordings at operadis-opera-discography.org.uk
 Libretto for La principessa della czarda in Italian on archive.org

Operas by Emmerich Kálmán
German-language operettas
1915 operas
Operas
Operas set in Hungary
Operas set in Vienna
Operas adapted into films